Lazaretto Point can refer to the following:

Lazaretto Point, Ardnadam, Argyll and Bute, Scotland 
Lazaretto Point War Memorial
Lazaretto Point Light, Baltimore, Maryland, U.S.